Megasis lesurella is a species of snout moth in the genus Megasis. It was described by Daniel Lucas in 1932 and is known from Morocco (including Aïn Leuh and Ifrane).

References

Moths described in 1932
Phycitini
Endemic fauna of Morocco
Moths of Africa